Zhuhai International Circuit (ZIC) (simplified Chinese: 珠海国际赛车场;) is located at Jin Ding town in Zhuhai City, Guangdong Province, China.

Motorsport started in Zhuhai when it hosted a race on its street circuit in 1993. Racing continued there until 1996 when the motor racing circuit was constructed and became China's first permanent motor race track with Formula One in mind.

The circuit was designed by Australian company Kinhill Engineers Pty Ltd, the same group which created the Formula One circuit in Adelaide. The project manager for the project was Michael McDonough.

The first international race held at the circuit was the BPR Global GT Series. The circuit soon became the hotbed of local motorsports with teams from Hong Kong and Macau setting up their bases inside the circuit garages.

Track layout 

The original circuit contained 16 corners. But corners 7, 8 and 9 were eliminated and made into one corner, after a track change request from FIM.

Alexandre Imperatori, A1 Team Switzerland's rookie driver, suggested that there are many overtaking places in the circuit because of the combination of straights, hard braking areas for hairpins, tight corners, followed by and accelerating for long straights. The most successful driver on the circuit is the best one who can manage their brake wear. Zhuhai International Circuit is an FIA Grade II certified circuit.

Lap records 
The fastest qualifying lap ever at the circuit was 1:23.203, set by Michael Ammermüller on a Lola A1GP on the fourth round on December 16, 2007 during the 2007-08 A1 Grand Prix season. However, this is not considered the lap record since lap records are taken from racing laps and not qualifying.

The fastest unofficial lap ever at the circuit was set by a 2007 Panoz DP01 Champ Car on November 30, 2006. Driven by Roberto Moreno, it managed a lap of 1:23.612 during a demonstration run.

The fastest unofficial GT1 lap time is set by Porsche 911 GT1 with Porsche AG team in 1996 4 Hours of Zhuhai. The time was 1:30.401.

The fastest unofficial lap ever on a motorcycle was set at a Pan Delta 1000cc Superbike race, taken by splitlath team. Winning all 6 races, Splitlath rider Mark Aitchison smashed the ZIC Superbike lap record 1:33.725 on an EBR RS 1190

The fastest official race lap records at the Zhuhai International Circuit are listed as:

Event organizer 
Zhuhai International Circuit Co Ltd is also a prominent motorsport event organizer and promoter in China. It has organized and promoted the FIA GT Championship in China and in 2007, it has also signed a contract with China Motorcycle Sports Association to promote the inaugural China Superbike Championship.

Races

National races 
Zhuhai International Circuit is the promoter of the China Superbike Championship, established in 2007 and sanctioned by the China Motorcycle Sports Association, CMSA.

ZIC also organizes the Circuit Hero and Circuit Hero GT race series, which allows citizens of the People's Republic of China to participate.

HTCC and MTCC 

The Hong Kong Touring Car Championship and the Macau Touring Car Championship both run the majority of their races at ZIC since they began.

Asian races 
The Asian Festival of Speed was held at the circuit from October 20, 2006 to October 22, 2006, when a record 33,000 people turned up to watch the races.

AFOS has been held at the circuit many times since its inception in 1994.

The Asian Formula Three Championship is also hosted by the circuit annually.

In addition, the FIM Asia Road Racing Championship race at ZIC regularly.

Formula One ambitions 
ZIC was included in the provisional 1999 F1 calendar, but the circuit subsequently lost its place in the calendar after failing to meet the international standards set by the FIA. F1 subsequently raced in Shanghai International Circuit.

Endurance World Championship 
In May 2004, the Endurance World Championship Zhuhai 6 Hours race was held at the circuit. This was the first time an international motorcycle race was held at the circuit.
 The race was won by GMT 94 Racing.

FIA GT Championship 

In 1997, the circuit hosted a race in the inaugural FIA GT Championship. It hosted further races in the series in 1999, 2004, 2005 and 2007. The 2007 event was postponed from October 2006 to March 2007, in order to avoid a clash with the Shanghai F1 Grand Prix in early October and the Macau Grand Prix in the middle of November. The race was won by All-Inkl.com racing's Lamborghini Murciélago R-GT, driven by Christophe Bouchut and Stefan Mucke. GT2 class was won by AF Corse's Ferrari F430 GT2, with Dirk Müller and Toni Vilander at the wheel.

A1 Grand Prix 

Zhuhai International Circuit staged the fourth round of the 2007-08 A1 Grand Prix season on December 16, 2007. The Sprint race was won by Michael Ammermüller of Team Germany and the Feature race was won by Narain Karthikeyan of Team India. On October 13, 2009, Executive Deputy General Manager of Zhuhai International Circuit, Stewart Tan, said he welcomed A1 Grand Prix's return to the circuit for November 15, 2009. However, the series had more races cancelled, with an announcement made on 5 November 2009 stating that races in China and Malaysia were not taking part.

Le Mans Intercontinental Cup 

The 2010 1000 km of Zhuhai was held at the circuit in November 2010, forming a round of the 2010 Le Mans Intercontinental Cup. In November 2011, the circuit hosted the 2011 6 Hours of Zhuhai, the finale of the 2011 Intercontinental Le Mans Cup season.

Super GT ambitions 

In 2004, the GT Association, the organizer of Super GT, announced on 23 May that an All-Star race in China, scheduled for 4 to 6 October at ZIC. But on 5 August 2004, JGTC announced that the race was cancelled, for reasons related to the Chinese organizer.

Champ Car 
A multi year deal was announced in 2006 that brought one of the American racing series to China. On 30 November 2006, Roberto Moreno made history as he took the 2007 DP01 Champ Car on track at the Zhuhai Circuit, marking the first time a Champ Car had run in China.

Then the series had problems with its promoter, which settled in a court in the US, and was replaced. The new promoter did not have enough time to organize the race on the original May date and so the race was provisionally moved to October 2007. When the series failed to get F.I.A. approval for the October date the 2007 race was cancelled. The series was looking to race in Zhuhai for the 2008 season until the unification with Indy Racing League but most of the speculation had died down.

Ownership 
On 2 October 2003, Dragon Hill Corporation Ltd, part of LBS Bina Group, exercised its option to buy Lamdeal Investment Ltd, which is involved in managing Zhuhai International Circuit Ltd (ZICL), for US$1. LBS managing director, Datuk Lim Hock San said LBS believed in the potential of the ZIC circuit land, adding the acquisition "has come at an appropriate time. Upon completion of the exercise of the option, Dragon Hill will hold 100% of the entire issued and paid-up share capital of Lamdeal and Lamdeal will own 60% of ZICL," he said.

Track rentals 
Since 2005, the circuit has become a hive of track activities, with a large number of auto-related launches and events held at the circuit, as the battle for car sales in China heats up. Auto dealers and manufacturers try to lure more customers by allowing them to drive freely on the track and pampering them off it.

Karting 

A kart circuit was added to the ZIC facility in 2004.

In 2011, Sunny Racing Club was established. The club uses a one make Sunnny Kart chassis and 2-stroke 100cc Yamaha engine.

Simulations 
GTR2 has the circuit simulated based on the 2004 FIA GT Championship season.
The circuit has also been simulated on the racing simulator Project CARS. In March 2018, the track was released for Raceroom Racing Experience.

Transportation 

The ZIC has a bus stop which is served by routes 3, 3A, 10, 10A, 66, 68 and 69 of the Zhuhai bus network.

It is also served by the Guangzhou–Zhuhai Intercity Mass Rapid Transit, as Tangjiawan Station is within walking distance of the circuit's west grandstand.

Notes

References

External links 

 
 
 Map and circuit history at RacingCircuits.info
 Sunny Racing Club - Kart Club

A1 Grand Prix circuits
Motorsport venues in Guangdong
Sport in Zhuhai
Sports venues completed in 1996
Sports venues in Guangdong